The Tenmei eruption was a large eruption of Mount Asama that occurred in 1783 (Tenmei 3). This eruption was one of the causes of the Tenmei famine. It is estimated that about 1,500–1,624 people were killed in the eruption.

Background
Japan is situated along a zone of convergence between at least four major and minor tectonic plates. The Philippine Sea Plate dives beneath the Amurian Plate and Okinawa Plate along the Nankai Trough and Ryukyu Trench in southern Japan. In northern Japan, the Pacific Plate subducts beneath the Okhotsk Plate, part of the larger North American Plate, along the Japan and Kuril trenches. The subduction process is related to the production of volcanoes in Japan as the downgoing oceanic slab undergoes dehydration at depths of roughly 90 to 100 km beneath the overriding plate. Water in the structure of hydrated minerals interact with the upper mantle, lowering its melting point. As the mantle begins to melt, its density decreases and rises through the upper crust, forming a volcanic vent.

1783 eruption of Mount Asama 

Mount Asama erupted in 1783, causing widespread damage.  The three-month-long Plinian eruption that began on 9 May 1783, produced andesitic pumice falls, pyroclastic flows, lava flows, and enlarged the cone. The climactic eruption began on 4 August and lasted for 15 hours, and contained pumice falls and pyroclastic flows.  The complex features of this eruption are explained by rapid deposits of coarse pyroclastic ash near the vent and the subsequent flows of lava; and these events which were accompanied by a high eruption plume which generated further injections of pumice into the air.

Dutch diplomat Isaac Titsingh's account of the Asama-Yama eruption was posthumously published in French in Paris in 1820;  and an English translation was published in London in 1822.  These books were based on Japanese sources, and the work represented the first of its kind to be disseminated in Europe and the West.

The volcano's devastation exacerbated what was already known as the "Tenmei famine". Much of the agriculturally productive land in Shinano and Kōzuke provinces would remain fallow or under-producing for the next four or five years.  The effects of this eruption were made worse because, after years of near or actual famine, neither the authorities nor the people had any remaining reserves. The 4 August eruption killed up to 1,400 people, with an additional 20,000 more deaths caused by the famine.Due to the Tenmei eruption, a lava flow called "Onioshidashi" flowed the northern slope of Mt. Asama. Now, it is known as a tourist destination.

Kanbara tragedy 
The most seriously damaged area by Tenmei eruption was the Kanbara (now Tsumagoi, Gunma Prefecture). Kanbara was destroyed by avalanche by eruption, 477 people were killed. Because of it, Kanbara is also called "Japan's Pompeii".

Gallery

References

External links 

 1783 天明浅間山噴火 - Japan Cabinet Office

1783 in Asia
Volcanic eruptions in Japan
1783 natural disasters
VEI-4 eruptions
18th-century volcanic events
Plinian eruptions